Eric Kelly may refer to:
 Eric Kelly (American football) (born 1977), former American football defensive back
 Eric Kelly (boxer) (born 1980), four-time national boxing champion, celebrity trainer, correspondent
 Eric P. Kelly (1884–1960), American journalist, academic and author of children's books